Bassirou Konté (born 18 July 1988) is an Ivorian cyclist.

Major results

2008
 1st Road race, National Road Championships
 1st Stage 6 Tour du Cameroun
2010
 1st Stage 2 Tour du Cameroun
 7th Overall Tour du Faso
2011
 10th Road race, All-Africa Games
2013
 1st Road race, National Road Championships
 1st Stage 7 Tour du Faso
2014
 1st Road race, National Road Championships
2015
 1st Stage 7 Tour du Cameroun
2016
 1st Road race, National Road Championships
2017
 1st Road race, National Road Championships
 5th Overall Tour de Côte d'Ivoire
1st Stage 3 (ITT)

References

1988 births
Living people
Ivorian male cyclists